The Sunday Express Book of the Year also known as The Sunday Express Fiction Award was awarded between 1987 and 1993. Worth £20,000 for the winner and £1,000 for each of the five shortlisted authors, it was the most lucrative fiction prize in Britain at the time.

Winners
1987 – Brian Moore, The Colour of Blood
1988 – David Lodge, Nice Work
1989 – Rose Tremain, Restoration
1990 – J. M. Coetzee, Age of Iron
1991 – Michael Frayn, A Landing on the Sun
1992 – Hilary Mantel, A Place of Greater Safety
1993 – William Boyd, The Blue Afternoon

References

British fiction awards
Awards established in 1987
1987 establishments in the United Kingdom
Awards disestablished in 1993
1993 disestablishments in the United Kingdom
Literary awards by magazines and newspapers
Daily Express
Annual events in the United Kingdom